Coonabarabran 
is a town in Warrumbungle Shire that sits on the divide between the Central West and North West Slopes regions of New South Wales, Australia. At the 2016 census, the town had a population of 2,537,and as of 2021, the population of Coonabarabran and its surrounding area is 3,477. Local and district residents refer to the town as 'Coona'.

History and description
In 1817 the area was opened up by a Government-sponsored expedition. In 1818 John Oxley found Aboriginal people living here — later identified as the western language reach of the Kamilaroi clans (Gamilaraay is the spelling used by linguists). Kamilaroi people are still well represented in the region, having occupied Coonabarabran for approximately 7,500 years.

In 1859 Lewis Gordon first proposed a town plan survey for Coonabarabran.

The origin of the name Coonabarabran is unconfirmed. It may derive from a person's name or from the Kamilaroi language word 'gunbaraaybaa' meaning 'excrement', translated earlier as  meaning, 'peculiar odour', this is possibly a bowdlerisation. Another meaning is derived from an Aboriginal word for 'inquisitive person'. 'Coolabarabran' was the name of a station owned by James Weston in 1848.

Coonabarabran Post Office opened on 1 January 1850.

Coonabarabran Memorial Clock Tower is a central feature of the town, in the intersection of John Street and Dalgarno Street. It was built from local sandstone and dedicated in 1928.

Coonabarabran is the gateway to the Warrumbungle National Park and the Pilliga Forest.

Heritage listings
Coonabarabran has a number of heritage-listed sites, including:
 Oxley Highway: Burra Bee Dee Mission

Population
According to the 2016 Census, there were 2,537 people in Coonabarabran.
 Aboriginal and Torres Strait Islander people made up 15.7% of the population. 
 82.8% of people were born in Australia and 87.5% of people spoke only English at home. 
 The most common responses for religion were Anglican 25.2%, No Religion 23.8% and Catholic 22.8%.

Astronomy
Coonabarabran is the closest town to the Siding Spring Observatory, which is home to the 3.9-metre Anglo-Australian Telescope, the largest optical telescope in Australia.  It is operated by the Australian Astronomical Observatory (formerly the Anglo-Australian Observatory).  A dozen other telescopes are on Siding Spring Mountain, a number of which are operated by the Research School of Astronomy and Astrophysics of the Australian National University.  Siding Spring is also home to the Uppsala Telescope where Robert H. McNaught discovered his now famous daylight comet C/2006 P1 in August 2006.  The Mopra Observatory, which is home to a 22-metre radio telescope owned and operated by the CSIRO is also near the Siding Spring Observatory, but is operated remotely from Narrabri.  A recent addition to the town was the construction of the world's largest virtual solar system drive on the roads leading to the observatory.  Coonabarabran markets itself as the "astronomy capital of Australia", many of the businesses and government buildings in the town feature astronomically themed information plaques.

Shops, Services and Recreation

Being a small country town, Coonabarabran has limited shops. There is a major chain shopping centres, Woolworths and a new IGA has opened after a major redevelopment of the Dalgarno St site (formerly Foodworks, Coles, Bi-lo, Tuckerbag, Payless, Permewans, and many others over the years), plus the fast food store Subway.  It also has other small cafe restaurants and take away stores. Until 2007 there was an IGA store, run by the Woo family, that supplied most of the town.

There is a newsagent, bakery, catering service, Chinese restaurant, one open hotel (Imperial Hotel) and two open clubs (Coonabarabran Bowling Club and Coonabarabran Golf Club). There are fashion establishments such as Surf, Work, Street, Sole Impression, The Lighthouse, Graces Uniforms, gift shops and several hair/beauty salons. It also has two variety secondhand clothing stores ADRA and a St Vincent DePaul. There is a hardware store: Home Hardware.  There are several car and heavy vehicle repairers and two tyre repairers.
A furniture store is also stationed in the towns Main Street: Hayes’s Homemaker Heaven.

The Coonabarabran Business Centre & Computer Hospital, next door to Chimps barbershop in the Imperial Hotel complex, opened in 2013.

The Coonabarabran Gym, Fit 4 All Coonabarabran, opened in 2022.

There are numerous motels, hotels, and caravan parks for travellers. The town has a library, post office, NRMA office and Service NSW office.

There is a hospital, 2 pharmacies, 2 dentists and a number of doctors.  There are aged care facilities in the town, providing hostel, lodge and nursing home facilities. There are also village self-care units.

Churches include St. Lawrence's Catholic Church, Anglican Church, Presbyterian Church, Uniting Church and Seventh Day Adventist Church.

Sport
Coonabarabran Unicorns rugby league team play in the Castlereagh Cup.

Climate
Coonabarabran has a subtropical climate (Köppen Cfa), with hot summers and cool winters. Rainfall is greatest from December to February with summer thunderstorms.

Media
Independently owned and operated, the Coonabarabran Times newspaper circulates throughout the Warrumbungle Shire area. Approximately 2700 copies are distributed each Thursday across the townships of Coonabarabran, Binnaway, Baradine, Coolah, Dunedoo, Mendooran and Mullaley. The Coonabarabran Times was founded in 1927 as an amalgamation of The Bligh Watchman (1877–1927) and The Clarion (1910–1927). It continues to be a solid publication, consisting of local news and issues facing the community, sport, events and advertisements.

Coonabarabran was one of the earliest towns to have a dedicated website after registering Coonabarabran.com in 1999 and creating a website in 2001. The site was closed and the domain sat idle after mismanagement of the domain after the closure of the Coonabarabran Technology Centre in 2013. A local individual then created Coonabarabran.org in 2013 which now hosts Coonabarabran News, an online curation of local news and interest stories.

Coonabarabran also has a Facebook page and Twitter account under the Coonabarabran name.

The area is currently served by a small community radio station, 2WCR FM. This station broadcasts on 99.5 FM. It has a good broadcasting range but it can be a bit scratchy due to the hill-like terrain.

Schools

In Coonabarabran are three schools:

Coonabarabran Public School
Coonabarabran Public School is on John Street, on the Oxley Highway and is Government funded. It has approximately 330 students, and offers from kindergarten to Year 6. Its Principal is Ms Juanita Meier. The School has many achievement awards  such as Personal Best, Strive to Achieve and Aiming for Excellence

Coonabarabran High School
Coonabarabran High School is on the Oxley Highway and is Government funded. It has approximately 380 students. It has a range of academic and sporting facilities including an agriculture plot, three computer labs, and a hall. The Principal is Mrs Mary Doolan, and the Deputy Principal is Mr Duncan Graham.

St Lawrence's Catholic School
St Lawrence's Catholic School is on Dalgarno Street. It caters for kindergarten to Year Six and has approximately 110 students. Education is based around the Catholic faith. It has an agriculture plot, a computer lab, recently renewed basketball courts and is across the road from St Lawrence's Catholic Church. The high school part of the school closed at the end of 2009.

Notable residents
 Elizabeth Bryan, chair of Insurance Australia Group
 Mary Jane Cain, indigenous Australian who was instrumental in the 1912 establishment of the "Burra Bee Dee" Aboriginal Reserve.
 Noel Knight, DFC, Coonabarabran-born and bred son of Mr and Mrs A. Knight, raised on "Tannabar". Flight Lieutenant Knight was a bomber pilot with the RAAF stationed in England in WWII and a 1944 recipient of the Distinguished Flying Cross.
 Kylea Tink, businesswoman and charity CEO
 Kyle Turner, rugby league player 2014 premiership winner with South Sydney
 Will Robinson, rugby league player

Transport
The township is on the Newell Highway and the Oxley Highway, approximately halfway between Melbourne and Brisbane and can be reached in about six hours by car from Sydney. It is on the main inland truck route between Queensland and Victoria.

The Gwabegar railway line passes through the town.  Passenger rail services were replaced by coaches in the 1970s. The section of the Gwabegar line between Binnaway and Gwabegar is booked out of use, from 28 October 2005 for safety reasons.

Coonabarabran Airport is 12 km south of the town.

References

External links
 
 Strap on your seatbelts and launch into Coonabarabran, The Astronomy Capital of Australia. Experience a scaled model of our Solar System that's 38 million times smaller than outer space!
 Coonabarabran Astronomy Capital of Australia
 Australia Telescope National Facility

Towns in New South Wales
Newell Highway
Warrumbungle Shire
Coonabarabran, New South Wales